169 Squadron or 169th Squadron may refer to:

 No. 169 Squadron RAF, a unit of the United Kingdom Royal Air Force
 169th Airlift Squadron (United States), a unit of the United States Air Force
 HMLA-169 (Marine Light Attack Helicopter Squadron 169), a United States Marine Corps helicopter squadron consisting